Khürelbaataryn Tsend-Ayuush (born 22 February 1990) is a Mongolian footballer, who plays as a midfielder for Mongolian National Premier League club Deren and the Mongolian national team. He is known for scoring the only goal of the match against Myanmar during the AFC section of 2014 FIFA World Cup qualifying on 29 June 2011 in Ulaanbaatar, Mongolia.

Career statistics

International goals

References

External links
International match report from www.sportnews.mn

1990 births
Living people
Mongolian footballers
Khoromkhon players
Sportspeople from Ulaanbaatar
Association football midfielders
Mongolia international footballers
Mongolian National Premier League players
Tuv Buganuud FC players